Christopher Simmons (born April 10, 1973) is a Canadian-born, San Francisco-based graphic designer, writer and educator.

Named one of the "50 most influential designers working today", he served on the board of directors of the San Francisco chapter of the AIGA from 1996 to 1999, and again as president (2004–2006). Among his enduring accomplishments in that position was the creation of San Francisco Design Week, and the introduction of the first public design-oriented lectures at the Apple Store, a free program which continues to this day. On completion of Simmons' tenure, mayor Gavin Newsom issued an official proclamation declaring San Francisco to be a city where "design makes a difference." Christopher currently serves on the AIGA's national board of directors.

Simmons is the principal creative director of the San Francisco design office MINE and the creator of the art installation Everything is OK.

The author of four books on graphic design, Simmons is also a frequent speaker on graphic design at schools and design organizations across the United States. His column My First Time appears regularly in "STEP inside design" magazine. He has contributed to works in the permanent collections of the San Francisco Museum of Modern Art and the Smithsonian Institution, and exhibited works at The Museum of Contemporary Art in Hiroshima, Japan, Taipei Design Week, and the Brno Design Biennial. Simmons developed and taught courses in Identity Design at the Academy of Art University in San Francisco, and was an adjunct professor of design at the California College of the Arts (CCA) in San Francisco (his alma mater).

Books
Logo Lab, HOW Design Books, 2005
Letterhead & Logo Design 9, Rockport Publishers, 2006
Color Harmony: Logos Rockport Publishers, 2006
Just Design HOW Design Books, 2011

References

External links
Personal Website
Design Matters Interview with Christopher Simmons
Creative Latitude Interview
Logolounge Interview
Fundraising Success Interview

1973 births
American graphic designers
Living people
California College of the Arts alumni
California College of the Arts faculty
Academy of Art University faculty